The 1980 German motorcycle Grand Prix was the last round of the 1980 Grand Prix motorcycle racing season. It took place on the weekend of 22–24 August 1980 at the Nürburgring-Nordschleife.

Classification

500 cc

References

German motorcycle Grand Prix
Motorcycle
German